Novy Varin is a rural locality (a settlement) in Klimovsky District, Bryansk Oblast, Russia. The population was 24 as of 2010. There is 1 street.

Geography 
Novy Varin is located 24 km southwest of Klimovo (the district's administrative centre) by road. Voznesensk is the nearest rural locality.

References 

Rural localities in Klimovsky District